is a  video game, developed by Access and published by Tomy Corporation, which was released exclusively in Japan for the Super Famicom in 1995.

This game is endorsed/supervised by Yoshiharu Habu.

Reception
On release, Famicom Tsūshin scored the game a 25 out of 40.

Images

See also 
 Meijin (shogi)
 List of shogi video games
 Saikyō Habu Shōgi, Nintendo 64 video game featuring Yoshiharu Habu
 Habu Yoshiharu Shōgi de Kitaeru: Ketsudanryoku DS, Nintendo DS video game featuring Yoshiharu Habu
 Shotest Shogi

References

External links 
 Habu Meijin no Omoshiro Shōgi at superfamicom.org
 Habu Meijin no Omoshiro Shōgi at super-famicom.jp 

1995 video games
Japan-exclusive video games
Shogi video games
Tomy games
Super Nintendo Entertainment System games
Super Nintendo Entertainment System-only games
Multiplayer and single-player video games
Video games developed in Japan